George Loveridge (15 October 1890 – 28 November 1970) was a New Zealand rugby union player. A wing three-quarter, Loveridge represented  at a provincial level, and was a member of the New Zealand national side, the All Blacks, in 1913 and 1914. He played 11 matches for the All Blacks but did not appear in any internationals.

During World War I, Loveridge—a telegraphist before the war—served overseas as a sapper with the New Zealand Field Engineers from 1916 to 1919. He served again during World War II as a sergeant with 2nd Battalion Taranaki Regiment, carrying out administrative duties in New Zealand between 1942 and 1943.

George's cousin, Norm Loveridge, represented New Zealand at rugby league.

References

1890 births
1970 deaths
Rugby union players from New Plymouth
New Zealand rugby union players
New Zealand international rugby union players
Taranaki rugby union players
Rugby union wings
New Zealand military personnel of World War I
New Zealand military personnel of World War II